The 2023 Argentine Primera Nacional, also known as the Campeonato de Primera Nacional "Campeones del Mundo" 2023, is the 39th season of the Primera Nacional, the second tier competition of Argentine football. The season began on 3 February and is scheduled to end in December 2023. Thirty-seven teams compete in the league, thirty-three of which took part in the 2022 season, along with two teams relegated from Primera División, one team promoted from Torneo Federal A and another one promoted from Primera B Metropolitana.

Format
For this season, the competition is played under a format similar to the one used for the 2021 season, with the thirty-seven participating teams being split into two zones, one of 19 teams and another one of 18 teams, where they will play against the other teams in their group twice: once at home and once away, with one team in Zone A having a bye in each round. No interzonal or derby matchdays will be played, and teams from the same city were drawn into different zones. Both zone winners will play a final match on neutral ground to decide the first promoted team to the Liga Profesional for the 2024 season, while the teams placed from second to eighth place in each zone will play a knockout tournament (Torneo Reducido) for the second promotion berth along with the loser of the final between the zone winners, which will join the Reducido in the second round. The teams placing in bottom place of each zone will be relegated at the end of the season, and the ones placing second-from-bottom in each group will play a playoff match to decide the third relegated team.

The draw to decide the fixture of the season was held on 29 December 2022 at the Argentine Football Association's Ezeiza offices.

Club information

Stadia and locations

Zone A

Standings

Results

Zone B

Standings

Results

Season statistics

Top scorers

{| class="wikitable" style="text-align:center"
|-
!Rank
!Player
!Club
!Goals
|-
|1
|align="left"| Milton Céliz
|align="left"|Deportivo Riestra
|5
|-
|rowspan=6|2
|align="left"| Alejandro Melo
|align="left"|Agropecuario Argentino
|rowspan=6|4
|-
|align="left"| Claudio Bieler
|align="left"|Atlético de Rafaela
|-
|align="left"| Patricio Vidal
|align="left"|Brown (A)
|-
|align="left"| Gabriel Benegas
|align="left"|Defensores de Belgrano
|-
|align="left"| Martín Pino
|align="left"|Guillermo Brown
|-
|align="left"| Facundo Castro
|align="left"|Quilmes
|}

See also
 2023 Argentine Primera División
 2023 Torneo Federal A
 2023 Copa Argentina

References

External links
 Ascenso del Interior  
 Interior Futbolero 
 Promiedos  

Primera B Nacional seasons
P
Arg